The Way We Were is the fifteenth studio album recorded by American singer Barbra Streisand. Following the commercial success of its lead single "The Way We Were", the album was released in January 1974.  Three additional songs were newly recorded for the album, while six of the tracks salvaged material from previously unreleased Streisand projects. Following the distribution of a soundtrack album for the 1973 film of the same title, Columbia added a caption to Streisand's LP (Featuring the Hit Single The Way We Were and All in Love Is Fair) in order to minimize confusion between the two albums.

Covering a wide array of themes and topics, Streisand sings about recovering relationships, social awareness, and love in general. Like the majority of Streisand's catalog, The Way We Were was described as a contemporary pop album blended with her signature vocal style. In terms of production, she heavily worked with Tommy LiPuma and Wally Gold, while Marty Paich contributed to the title track. The lead single ("The Way We Were") was released on September 27, 1973, and became a chart-topper in both the United States and Canada. It was also the top-selling single in the former country in 1974. The second and final single, "All in Love Is Fair", was released in March 1974 and also charted in the two countries.

The album received generally favorable reviews from music critics, who praised Streisand's vocals and found the record capable of being extremely successful. However, some critics felt the album was not carefully planned out and Streisand was acting out the tracks rather than actually singing them. Commercially, The Way We Were topped the Billboard 200 in the United States and reached the top ten on album charts in Australia and Canada. It also entered the charts in Japan and the United Kingdom. Due to strong sales, it has since been certified 2× Platinum in the United States by the Recording Industry Association of America (RIAA).

Background and release 
The concept for the record first developed in late 1973, following the success of "The Way We Were", which was written specifically for the 1973 film of the same title starring Streisand and Robert Redford. American composer and producer Marvin Hamlisch was commissioned to write the melody for the track, which he found to be hugely challenging due to Streisand's wants. She had wanted him to produce the composition in minor key, but he instead wrote it in major key due to his fear that the song's lyrics would be revealed too quickly to the listener. According to the liner notes of her 1991 greatest hits album Just for the Record, "The Way We Were", "All in Love is Fair", "Being at War with Each Other", and "Something So Right" were the only tracks specifically recorded and created for the album. The majority of the project's material consisted of demos and recordings from Streisand's recording sessions with Alan Bergman and Marilyn Bergman for an unreleased album titled The Singer. Both "The Best Thing You've Ever Done" and "Summer Me, Winter Me" were previously released together as a non-album single by Streisand in April 1970, and were originally intended for inclusion on the official soundtrack to her 1970 film The Owl and the Pussycat.

Recording sessions for the album took place at United-Western Recorders in Los Angeles between September 1969 and December 1973, while the mixing was performed at Hollywood Sound during that same time period. "What Are You Doing the Rest of Your Life?" and "My Buddy"/"How About Me" were the first two songs recorded, while "Being at War with Each Other", "Something So Right", and "All in Love Is Fair" were the final three to be completed. Al Schmitt handled the engineering and mixing aspects for the finished tracks, while Doug Sax mastered the pieces at The Mastering Lab, also in Los Angeles. Streisand and Columbia Records released The Way We Were on January 1, 1974, as her fifteenth studio album overall, and first since 1973's Barbra Streisand…and Other Musical Instruments. However, Columbia switched the title of the album at the last minute to Featuring the Hit Single The Way We Were and All in Love Is Fair in order to distinguish Streisand's record from the 1974 soundtrack of the same title with the same release date. The same label issued this version as an 8-track cartridge in 1974, with a differing track listing: both "Something So Right" and "Summer Me, Winter Me" are broken into two separate parts increasing the number of tracks on the record from ten to twelve. The album was later released in CD and digital formats on February 5, 2008.

Music and lyrics 

As a whole, the record is a contemporary pop piece, incorporating elements from Streisand's signature musical style. The Way We Were begins with "Being at War with Each Other", a cover of the Carole King song from her 1973 studio album, Fantasy, although King wrote the track specifically for Streisand. Produced by LiPuma, she sings about various topics, ranging from socialization and relationships. She also claims that all humans stem from "one father" and "one mother" and how differing opinions only "complicate our lives". "Something So Right" is also a cover and originally the B-side track to Paul Simon's 1973 single "Take Me to the Mardi Gras". It focuses heavily on the songwriting rather than the production, although the composition was the second included to be produced by LiPuma. "The Best Thing You've Ever Done" was originally written in 1970 by Charnin who maintained interest in creating a composition for Streisand. Additionally, Wally Gold handled the production for the track, the first of six on the album. Lead single "The Way We Were" is the album's fourth track. In particular, its lyrics detail the personal life of Katie Morosky, the character Streisand portrays in the previously mentioned film, and her troubling relationship with boyfriend Hubbell Gardiner. Track five, "All in Love Is Fair", is a Stevie Wonder cover but is fronted by Streisand's own personal take on it. She sings about a failing relationship through the use of clichés and obvious messages regarding love.

"What Are You Doing the Rest of Your Life?" was written by French composer Michel Legrand (who would continue writing songs with Streisand for years) and Alan and Marilyn Bergman. Gold also produced it, while Peter Matz arranged the instruments and orchestration that accompanied the composition. Seventh and eighth tracks "Summer Me, Winter Me" and "Pieces of Dreams", respectively, also feature contributions from Legrand, with the former originally created specifically for The Singer and the latter a cover of the 1970 version for the film Pieces of Dreams. "I've Never Been a Woman Before" is song written by Tom Baird and Ron Miller for Cherry, an unproduced musical based on the William Inge play Bus Stop. The closing song on the record is a medley of "My Buddy" and "How About Me", from Gus Kahn, Walter Donaldson, and Irving Berlin. The first part of the melody details someone affected by the loss of a friend, particularly a soldier who died during combat, as noted by author Robert Eberwein in his 2007 book Armed Forces; Masculinity and Sexuality in the American War Film.

Singles 

The album's lead single "The Way We Were" was released as a 7" record on September 27, 1973, roughly three weeks before the premiere of the accompanying film. The song was largely successful after its initial release, where it reached number one on the Billboard Hot 100 and spent twenty-three consecutive weeks among the ranking. Its success was replicated in Canada, where it was also number one. "The Way We Were" was additionally the top-selling single in the United States in 1974 according to the list compiled by Billboard. It was also sent to adult contemporary radio, where it topped the Adult Contemporary charts in both the United States and Canada. On August 19, 1997, "The Way We Were" was certified platinum by the Recording Industry Association of America, signifying sales of over 1,000,000 copies. The single has since been considered to be one of her signature songs. For their work on the track, Hamlisch and the Bergman's won the Academy Award for Best Original Song at the 46th Academy Awards, with Hamlisch also winning the Academy Award for Best Original Score for his work on the film. It additionally won the Golden Globe Award for Best Original Song in 1974 and the Grammy Award for Song of the Year in 1975. On the National Endowment for the Arts and Recording Industry Association of America's list of the top 365 "Songs of the Century", "The Way We Were" was placed at number 298.

"All in Love Is Fair" was released as the album's second single in March 1974, a cover of the Stevie Wonder original for his 1973 album, Innervisions. Columbia also released it as a 7" single paired alongside the medley of "My Buddy" and "How About Me". Matthew Greenwald from AllMusic was so fond of her rendition that he wrote: "It is no doubt one of the most graceful and memorable hooks from the era, and Streisand's performance – particularly her phrasing of this line – is unforgettable". It failed to replicate the success of "The Way We Were", but it managed to peak at numbers 63 and 60 in the United States and Canada, respectively. It additionally reached the top ten of the Adult Contemporary chart, also compiled by Billboard.

In 1972, Streisand's version of "What Are You Doing the Rest of Your Life?" was released as a promotional single in the United States in the 7" vinyl format. It was paired alongside "The Best Thing You've Ever Done", which is also included on The Way We Were.

Critical reception 

The Way We Were has received generally favorable reviews from music critics. Robert Christgau enjoyed the overall sound of the album, noting that the catchiness of roughly half the album allows for the songs to be replayed over and over. The editors at Billboard were appreciative of the release, and singled out The Way We Were in its "Spotlight" section for the February 9, 1974 issue. The publication highlighted album tracks "Being at War with Each Other" and "All in Love Is Fair" and declared: "This is the way Streisand should sound." Stephen Holden from Rolling Stone labeled it "her best album in years"; he also found that her voice sounds just "as fresh as it did in the sixties".

Jon Landau, also from Rolling Stone, was disappointed by the singer's effort, writing that she "no longer sings songs", but rather "acts them out". He referenced her catalogue and stated: "I've enjoyed Barbra Streisand's music in the past, but of the 20 albums I listened to to write this column, The Way We Were was not only the most disappointing, but the most difficult to get all the way through." AllMusic's William Ruhlmann awarded the album three out of five stars but found it obvious that the record was "thrown together" instead of being orchestrated and thought out carefully. He also declared that the success of the title track "propelled th[e] album to the top of the charts".

Commercial performance 
In the United States, the album debuted at number 97 on the Billboard 200 chart for the week ending February 16, 1974, and by February 26, had already sold 500,000 copies and was certified Gold. The following week it rose to number 39, and on March 16 of the same year, it reached the top position. It became Streisand's second number one and seventh top five album, with the other number-one being People (1964). The Way We Were spent two weeks at the highest position before falling to number four on March 30. It continued dropping on the charts but managed to stay within the top 10 of the list for a total of six weeks. The Recording Industry Association of America changed its certification status to Platinum for shipments upwards of 1,000,000 sales, and again on September 23, 1998, The Way We Were was certified for selling over 2,000,000 copies. In the United Kingdom, it peaked at number 49 in May 1974, and was certified Silver for shifting 60,000 physical copies.

On Canada's Top Albums/CDs chart conducted by RPM, the record debuted at number 76 during the week of February 23, 1974. The Way We Were peaked at number three on March 30 and spent another week at that same position on April 6. It dropped to number nine the succeeding week and spent a total of twenty-three weeks in that country, with its final position being number 91 during the week of August 3. Music Canada reported in 1978 that the record had sold over 100,000 copies in their country, prompting it to become certified Platinum. In Australia and Japan, The Way We Were peaked at positions 7 and 73, respectively. It was later certified gold in the former country after selling approximately 35,000 copies.

Track listing

Personnel 
Credits adapted from the liner notes of the CD edition of The Way We Were.

 Barbra Streisand vocals
 David Bailey back cover photography
 Nick DeCaro arranging 
 Wally Gold production 
 Tommy LiPuma executive production, remixing
 Stephen Marcussen remastering 
 Peter Matz arranging 

 Claus Ogerman arranging 
 Marty Paich production, arranging 
 Doug Sax original mastering
 Steve Schapiro cover photography
 Al Schmitt engineering, mixing
 Stewart Whitmore digital editing 
 Frank DeCaro music contractor

Charts

Weekly charts

Year-end charts

Certifications and sales

References 

Works cited

External links 
 

1974 albums
Albums arranged by Marty Paich
Albums arranged by Peter Matz
Albums arranged by Claus Ogerman
Albums produced by Tommy LiPuma
Barbra Streisand albums
Columbia Records albums
Albums recorded at United Western Recorders